The rivière aux Vaches is a tributary of the Saint-François River. It flows northwest in the administrative region of Centre-du-Québec, on the South Shore of the Saint Lawrence River, in Quebec, Canada, crossing the municipalities of:
 MRC of Drummond Regional County Municipality: town of Drummondville ("Grantham-Ouest" sector) and the municipalities of Saint-Majorique-de-Grantham, Saint-Bonaventure, Saint-Pie-de-Guire, Saint-François-du-Lac;
 MRC of Nicolet-Yamaska Regional County Municipality: municipality of Saint-François-du-Lac.

Geography 

The main hydrographic slopes near the Vaches River are:
 North side: Saint-François River;
 East side: Saint-François River;
 South side: Saint-Germain River;
 West side: David River, Yamaska River.

The Vaches River originates from agricultural streams draining the area north of highway 20 and north of the highway Interchange 55, west of the city of Drummondville. This headland is located in the "Grantham-Ouest" sector, north of highway 20 and west of the town of Drummondville.

From autoroute 20, the rivière aux Vaches flows mainly in agricultural zones on:
  north-west in the "Grantham-Ouest" sector, up to boul. Lemire West;
  northwesterly, crossing Saint-Majorique-de-Grantham and Saint-Bonaventure where it winds, up to rang Petit 5 road;
  north-west, to the 2e rang road;
  ( in direct line) along route 143 and meandering northwest through Saint-Pie-de-Guire, up to the 13e rang road that the river crosses to the northeast of the village;
  ( in direct line) winding north-west through Saint-Pie-de-Guire and Saint-François-du-Lac, up to the mouth.

The Vaches River flows on the southwest bank of the Saint-François River, facing "La Grande Île" and at the foot of the "Rapides Pôltegok".

Toponymy 

The course of the river being mainly in agricultural zone, the cattle (especially cows) come to drink there during all the grazing season (usually from May to November for this region). The river was also used as a grazing limit because the cattle are bad swimmers. Given the relatively uneven relief of this hydrographic slope, the "Vaches River" is aptly named.

The toponym "Rivière aux Vaches" was officially registered on December 5, 1968, at the Commission de toponymie du Québec.

See also 

 List of rivers of Quebec

References 

Rivers of Centre-du-Québec
Nicolet-Yamaska Regional County Municipality
Drummond Regional County Municipality